Mwandiga is an administrative ward in Kigoma District of Kigoma Region in Tanzania. 
In 2016 the Tanzania National Bureau of Statistics report there were 20,810 people in the ward, from 18,906 in 2012.

Villages / neighborhoods 
The ward has 3 villages and 21 hamlets.

 Mwandiga
 Majengo
 Mgera A
 Mgera B
 Mwandiga Kaskazini
 Mwandiga Magharibi
 Mwandiga Mashariki
 Sokoni
 Uwanjani
 Kibingo
 Bigabiro A
 Bigabiro B
 Kasesa
 Kibingo A
 Kibingo B
 Kiganza
 Bukemba
 Bweru A
 Bweru B
 Kaziba
 Kiganza CCM
 Kiganza Kati
 Kiganza Senta
 Kitobe

References

Wards of Kigoma Region